Griptape is an album by the band Further, released in 1992.

Lee Ranaldo of Sonic Youth guests on tracks 3 and 6.

Critical reception
Trouser Press called the album "a riot of distortion and croaky off-key singing, straggling happily through its peppy and tuneful pop-song bits to reach the chewy center of slack squall jams each contains."

Track listing 

 Overrated
 Filling Station
 Flounder (Ubel)
 Real Gone
 Gimme Indie Fox
 Still
 Smudge
 Greasy
 Bazzoka
 Fix Its Broken
 Don't Need A Rope
 Fantastic Now
 Under And In
 Death Of An A&r Man
 Westward Ho

References

1992 albums